Terry Pettit is a retired American volleyball coach. His only major coaching position was at Nebraska from 1977 to 1999, where he led the Cornhuskers to the school's first NCAA national championship in 1995 by defeating Texas in the final. He led the team to 21 Big Eight and Big 12 conference championships in his 23 seasons as head coach and established Nebraska as one of the most decorated programs in the sport of volleyball.

Early life
Terry Pettit is a published poet who earned an MFA in creative writing, after earning a B.S. in English from Manchester University in Indiana. He attended graduate school in theology and worked as a reporter for the Church of the Brethren before teaching English at Louisburg College, in Louisburg, North Carolina.

At Nebraska

Terry Pettit was Nebraska's second coach from, and from 1977 to 1999 he built the Cornhuskers into a national power. He led the program to its first national championship (1995), two national runner-up finishes (1986, 1989), and three other national semifinal appearances (1990, 1996, 1998). Pettit earned 19 consecutive NCAA Tournament appearances from 1982 through 1999, and won the Big 8/Big 12 every year except 1993, and 1997, guiding the Huskers to a 694–148 record in his 23 years. He was named the Big 8/Big 12 Coach of the Year in 1985 – 1987, 1989, 1990, 1994 – 1996, and 1998, and the AVCA National Coach of the Year in 1986 and 1994.  Pettit was the recipient of the USA Volleyball All-Time Great Coach Award in 2004. Under his tutelage, Karen Dahlgren was named National Player of the Year in 1986 and Allison Weston was named National Player of the Year in 1995.  Nebraska led the nation in both All-American and Academic All-American selections during his tenure.

Legacy
Pettit built one of the most tradition-rich and powerful volleyball programs in NCAA history. To this day, Nebraska has sold out over 300 consecutive games between the Nebraska Coliseum and Bob Devaney Sports Center, and participated in the six highest-attended volleyball games in NCAA history. At the top of this list is Nebraska's victory over Florida on December 16, 2017, when 18,516 fans, nearly all of which wore red, watched the Cornhuskers defeat the Gators 3–1 for the national title at the Sprint Center in Kansas City, Missouri.

In December 2008 Pettit authored "Talent and the Secret Life of Teams," a collection of essays, columns, and creative writing on leadership and team-building based on his career as a coach and director of leadership academies at Creighton University, the University of Denver, and Colorado State University. In December 2013 Pettit authored a second book, "A Fresh Season – Insights Into Coaching, Leadership and Volleyball."

On September 6, 2013, Nebraska played their inaugural match in the newly renovated Bob Devaney Sports Center which became their new home after playing its first 37 seasons in the historic Nebraska Coliseum from 1975 to 2012. To mark the occasion of the team's move to the newly renovated facility, Terry Pettit was honored with a court-naming ceremony during the match against Villanova University. Terry Pettit Court is etched along the sideline on the southwest side of the court.

In 2020, Pettit was inducted into Nebraska's athletic hall of fame.

Head coaching record

The Big 12 does not play conference tournaments.

References

External links
 

1946 births
Living people
American volleyball coaches
Nebraska Cornhuskers women's volleyball coaches
Manchester University (Indiana) alumni
Writers from Nebraska